Congregation House of Israel is an Orthodox synagogue in Sainte-Agathe-des-Monts, Quebec, serving the Laurentian Jewish community. It was officially opened on 12 July 1953.

The congregation is led by Rabbi Emanuel Carlebach, who assumed the role upon the passing of his father Rabbi Ephraim Carlebach in 1985. The House of Israel counts more than 1,500 families as members, mostly Montrealers with second homes in the Laurentians. The congregation also hosts a religious school and early learning centre.

References

1953 establishments in Quebec
Ashkenazi Jewish culture in Quebec
Ashkenazi synagogues
Buildings and structures in Laurentides
Jewish organizations based in Canada
Jews and Judaism in Quebec
Jewish organizations established in 1953
Sainte-Agathe-des-Monts
Synagogues in Quebec
Orthodox Judaism in Quebec
Orthodox synagogues in Canada